Qowsheh Degarman (also Romanized as Qowsheh Degarmān and Qūsheh Degermān) is a village in Rezvan Rural District, Kalpush District, Meyami County, Semnan Province, Iran. At the 2006 census, its population was 315, in 78 families.

References 

Populated places in Meyami County